Barbara is a genus of moths belonging to the subfamily Olethreutinae of the family Tortricidae.

Species
Barbara colfaxiana (Kearfott, 1907)
Barbara fulgens Kuznetzov, 1969
Barbara herrichiana Obraztsov, 1960
Barbara mappana Freeman, 1941

See also
List of Tortricidae genera

References

External links
tortricidae.com

Tortricidae genera
Olethreutinae